Sydnor is a surname. Notable people with the surname include:

Buck Sydnor (1921–2003), American basketball player
Charles Sydnor (disambiguation), multiple people
Eugene B. Sydnor Jr. (1917–2003), American businessman and politician
Willie Sydnor (born 1959), American football player